Macbeth, is a silent 1909 film adaptation of the William Shakespeare play. It was released on 3 December 1909. It is a silent black-and-white film with French intertitles.

Cast
Paul Mounet as Macbeth
Jeanne Delvair as Lady Macbeth

References

1909 films
Films based on Macbeth
French silent short films
French black-and-white films
1909 drama films
French drama short films
Silent drama films
1900s French films